Trace of a Girl is a 1967 West German drama film directed by Gustav Ehmck and starring Thekla Carola Wied, Gunther Lagarde and Rainer Basedow.

The film won two German Film Awards.

Cast
 Thekla Carola Wied as Hanna
 Gunther Lagarde as Peter
 Rainer Basedow as Landwirt
 Günter Seuren as Schriftsteller
 Hermann Hartmann as Father
 Birgit Füllenbach as Mother
 Charles Wilp as Fotograf

References

Bibliography
 Peter Cowie & Derek Elley. World Filmography: 1967. Fairleigh Dickinson University Press, 1977.

External links

1967 films
West German films
1967 drama films
German drama films
1960s German-language films
1960s German films